Melanson is a surname. Notable people with the surname include:

People
Chester Melanson (born 1940), Canadian politician and member in the Nova Scotia House of Assembly
Dean Melanson (born 1973), former National Hockey League defenceman
Louis-Joseph-Arthur Melanson (1879–1941), Canadian priest and Archbishop
Melanie Melanson (born 1974), a missing teenager from Woburn, Middlesex County, Massachusetts since 1989
Neil Melanson, American combat sports coach
Olivier-Maximin Melanson (1854–1926), Acadian businessman
Philip H. Melanson (1944–2006), American educator
Roger Melanson, Canadian politician, member in the Legislative Assembly of New Brunswick
Roland Melanson (born 1960), former National Hockey League goaltender and current goaltender coach
Simeon Melanson (1873–1964), Canadian politician and member of the Legislative Assembly of New Brunswick

Places
Melanson, Nova Scotia, a community in the Canadian province of Nova Scotia, located in Kings County
Val-Melanson, New Brunswick, an unincorporated community in Restigouche County, New Brunswick, Canada

See also
Melançon